The Cock and Hoop is a Grade II listed public house in the Lace Market, Nottingham.

History

The site on which the pub is located was formerly a house occupied by Joseph Pearson in 1832. From 1833 to around 2000 it was the County Tavern public house. The first landlord recorded is Thomas Harrison

In 1905, William Wilson the landlord since September 1903 was declared bankrupt.

It was rebuilt by Basil Baily and Albert Edgar Eberlin in 1933 for the Home Brewery Company.

It was taken over by the owners of the Lace Market Hotel and renamed Cock and Hoop in the early 21st century. It closed briefly in 2014 following the failure of the Lace Market Hotel, but re-opened again in 2015.

Cook and Hoop have permanent fixture ales from Robin Hood Brewery and Magpie Brewery.

References

Grade II listed buildings in Nottinghamshire
Pubs in Nottingham
Basil Baily